Cosmopterix epismaragda is a moth in the family Cosmopterigidae. It was described by Edward Meyrick in 1932. It is found in Ethiopia.

References

Endemic fauna of Ethiopia
Moths described in 1932
epismaragda